Gadeukbong is a mountain in the county of Inje, Gangwon-do, in South Korea.

See also
List of mountains in Korea

Notes

References

Mountains of South Korea
Inje County
Mountains of Gangwon Province, South Korea
One-thousanders of South Korea